The Old Walnut Ridge Post Office is a historic commercial building at 225 West Main Street in Walnut Ridge, Arkansas.  It is a -story T-shaped brick structure, five bays wide, with a side gable roof and a full concrete basement.  Its Colonial Revival features include a centered entry, flanked by Ionic pilasters and topped by a broken gabled pediment.  The remaining bays are filled with nine-over-nine sash windows.  The eave is plain concrete, except for a course of modillions just below the roof line.  The building was designed under Louis A. Simon of the Office of the Supervising Architect and was completed in 1935. It served as a post office until 1977, and then served as the facilities of the local Times Dispatch newspaper.

The building was listed on the National Register of Historic Places in 1994.

See also 

National Register of Historic Places listings in Lawrence County, Arkansas
List of United States post offices

References 

Post office buildings on the National Register of Historic Places in Arkansas
Colonial Revival architecture in Arkansas
Commercial buildings completed in 1935
Buildings and structures in Lawrence County, Arkansas
National Register of Historic Places in Lawrence County, Arkansas